Neopolyptychus pygarga is a moth of the family Sphingidae. It is known from forests in western Africa, including Cameroon and Nigeria.

The wingspan is 33–38 mm for males.

References

Neopolyptychus
Moths described in 1891
Insects of Cameroon
Moths of Africa
Insects of the Democratic Republic of the Congo
Insects of West Africa
Insects of Angola
Fauna of Gabon